Francisco Ibáñez Irribarría (Oyón, Alava, 1951) is a Basque composer. He studied in Barcelona with Carles Guinovart.

References

Basque composers
1951 births
Living people
Place of birth missing (living people)